Rashtrapati Nilayam (literally the "President's House") formerly known as Residency House is the official retreat of the President of India located in Hyderabad, Telangana, where the President stays for at least two weeks during winter and conducts official business. It is also used as a guest house for visiting dignitaries. It is located in Bollaram in Secunderabad, a neighborhood of Hyderabad. It is open for public viewing for several days in early January annually.

History
Originally called the Residency House, it was constructed in 1850 by Nizam Nazir-ud-Dowla. It became the country house of the British Resident at Secunderabad. After the Hyderabad state's integration into Indian Union (Read Operation Polo) in 1948, it became the President's retreat and used as the Southern Sojourn.

Architecture

It has a Dining Hall, Darbar Hall, Morning Room, Cinema Hall, etc. A unique aspect of this Rashtrapati Nilayam is that the kitchen and dining hall are independent buildings connected with a tunnel to serve food. 

The retreat's premises include a landscaped garden, seasonal flowering plants and display of potted plants around the main building, natural cascading water falls and seven different types of nutrition gardens which are: Mango, Pomegranate, Guava, Amla, Coconut and Cheeku(Sapota).

Garden
The Herbal Garden, inaugurated in December 2009, of medicinal and aromatic plants is spread over 7,000 sq metres, has about 116 species of medicinal and aromatic plants including sarpagandha, kalabandha, citronella, lemon grass, khus, geranium, coriander, sandalwood, tuber rose, jasmine, kalmegh, tulsi etc.  The garden was built by CPWD and the Telangana Medicinal Plants Board, while Rashtrapati Bhavan and National Medicinal Plants Board funded the project.

See also
 List of official residences of India
 Rashtrapati Bhavan, New Delhi
 The Retreat Building, Shimla
 Rashtrapati Ashiana, Dehradun

References

External links
 The official web site of President of India: President's Retreats
Times of India
Tribune

Hyderabad State
Official residences in India
Buildings and structures in Secunderabad
Tourist attractions in Hyderabad, India
Presidential residences in India
Palaces in Hyderabad, India